The chorobates, described by Vitruvius in Book VIII of the De architectura, was used to measure horizontal planes and was especially important in the construction of aqueducts.

Similar to modern spirit levels, the chorobates consisted of a beam of wood 6 m in length held by two supporting legs and equipped with two plumb lines at each end. The legs were joined to the beam by two diagonal rods with carved notches.  If the notches corresponding to the plumb lines matched on both sides, it showed that the beam was level. On top of the beam, a groove or channel was carved.  If the condition was too windy for the plumb bobs to work effectively, the surveyor could pour water into the groove and measure the plane by checking the water level.

See also
Groma
Dioptra
Chorography
Odometer

References

M. J. T. Lewis. Surveying Instruments of Greece and Rome. Cambridge University Press. . 2001. p 31.

External links
Surveying and engineering in Ancient Rome
Chorobates described

Measuring instruments
Surveying
Ancient Greece
Ancient Roman architecture